Samuel Chomba (5 January 1964 – 27 April 1993) was a Zambian footballer who played as a defender. He was a member of the Zambia national team. He was among those killed in the crash of the team plane in Gabon in 1993.

Career
Chomba played club football for Kabwe Warriors.

Chomba made several appearances for the Zambia national team and participated in the 1990 and 1992 African Cup of Nations finals. He also played for Zambia at the 1988 Summer Olympics in Seoul.

References

External links
 
 
 Biography at Sports-reference.com

1964 births
1993 deaths
Zambian footballers
Association football defenders
Zambia international footballers
Olympic footballers of Zambia
Footballers at the 1988 Summer Olympics
1990 African Cup of Nations players
1992 African Cup of Nations players
Victims of aviation accidents or incidents in Gabon
Footballers killed in the 1993 Zambia national football team plane crash